Courtenay Stewart (born January 17, 1985) is a Canadian synchronized swimmer, who won the silver medal in the women's duet at the 2003 Pan American Games alongside partner Fanny Létourneau.

Early life and education
Courtenay Stewart was born on January 17, 1985 in Unionville, Ontario, Canada.

She attended Stanford University and swam for the Stanford Synchronized Swimming Squad. She graduated from osteopathic medical school at Touro University California.

She completed her residency in Physical Medicine and Rehabilitation at Stanford University Medical Center and is completing a CERC Fellowship (clinical excellence research center) at Stanford University Medical Center.

Career
Stewart  was affiliated with the Riverside AQuettes, Riverside.

She won the silver medal in the women's duet at the 2003 Pan American Games alongside partner Fanny Létourneau.

Her best finish at the 2003 world championships in Barcelona, Spain was a fourth-place finish in the free routine combination.

She was a member of the 2004 Canadian Olympic Team that placed 5th at the Games in Athens, Greece.  Courtenay, along with duet partner Létourneau, placed sixth in duet at the Olympics as well.

References

1985 births
Living people
Olympic synchronized swimmers of Canada
Synchronized swimmers at the 2004 Summer Olympics
Sportspeople from Ontario
Canadian synchronized swimmers
Pan American Games silver medalists for Canada
Pan American Games medalists in synchronized swimming
Synchronized swimmers at the 2003 Pan American Games
Medalists at the 2003 Pan American Games
20th-century Canadian women
21st-century Canadian women